The Akron Firestone Non-Skids were an American professional basketball team based in Akron, Ohio. The team was one of the thirteen founding members of the National Basketball League (NBL), which formed in 1937. The team was named for the Firestone Tire and Rubber Company, which was headquartered in Akron.

Franchise history
The team was founded by Firestone as an amateur industrial team. Like other industrial teams of the era, the players were company employees with year-round jobs who were not paid for basketball but owed their jobs to their basketball skills. The Non-Skids first competed professionally in the 1932–33 National Basketball League and defeated the Indianapolis Kautskys in the championship game. In 1935, the Non-Skids joined the Midwest Basketball Conference. In 1937, Firestone, General Electric, and Goodyear created the National Basketball League from company-sponsored teams and independent teams.  The Non-Skids were NBL champions in 1939 and 1940, defeating the Oshkosh All-Stars both years in the Finals. Following the 1940–1941 season, the Akron Firestone Non-Skids disbanded, leaving the Akron Goodyear Wingfoots as the only NBL team representing Akron.

Season-by-season records

Players of note
Chuck Taylor
Soup Cable
John Moir
Wesley Bennett
Irving Terjesen
Roy "Goose" Burris

Coaches
Paul Sheeks

References

External links
Firestone Non-Skids Complete History
Akron Firestone Non-Skids at Ohio History Central

 
1937 establishments in Ohio
Basketball teams established in 1937
Basketball teams disestablished in 1941
1941 disestablishments in Ohio